KVOL (1330 AM) is a radio station licensed to Lafayette, Louisiana, United States. It serves the Acadiana area. KVOL was the first radio station in Lafayette when they signed on-air on May 18, 1935. It is owned and operated by Delta Media Corporation. KVOL's studios are located on Evangeline Thruway in Carencro, and its transmitter is located in west Lafayette.

On March 7, 2022, KVOL changed their format from oldies to soft oldies, branded as "97.7/1330 MeTV FM".

Programming
KVOL is a soft oldies formatted radio station known as "97.7/1330 MeTV FM". MeTV FM focuses on "The Greatest Hits of All Time" from 1965 to 1985. Feature programming also includes "On The Turntable", a weekly program that features a historic look at classic vinyl albums and played in their entirety. The Rewind also airs Scott Shannon presents America's Greatest Hits each Sunday morning at 9am, The Blue Suede Connection each Saturday morning at 7am, and The Beatles Brunch each Sunday morning at 10am.

K249EY
During the FCC's AM Revitalization project in mid-2016, Delta Media purchased 99.9 W260CK in Slidell from Educational Media Foundation, intending to relocate it to Lafayette as a KVOL repeater at 97.7. The move was completed and the newly rechristened K249EY signed on, relaying KVOL from its new location September 5, 2016.

Previous logo

References

External links

VOL
Radio stations established in 1935
1935 establishments in Louisiana
Oldies radio stations in the United States